Eva Celbová-Ryšavá (born 8 March 1975 in Náchod) is a female beach volleyball player from the Czech Republic, who twice represented her native country at the Summer Olympics in 2000 and 2004. Partnering Sona Novaková she claimed the gold medal at the 1998 European Championships.

Playing partners
 Soňa Nováková
 Šárka Nakládalová
 Tereza Petrová
 Marika Těknědžjanová
 Tereza Tobiášová

References

External links
 
 
 
 
 

1975 births
Living people
Czech beach volleyball players
Women's beach volleyball players
Beach volleyball players at the 2000 Summer Olympics
Beach volleyball players at the 2004 Summer Olympics
Olympic beach volleyball players of the Czech Republic
People from Náchod
Sportspeople from the Hradec Králové Region